William Wagner (13 September 1820 – 25 February 1901) was a Polish born immigrant to Canada who became a certified land surveyor after he reached the country. In 1860 he was appointed immigration commissioner and sent to Germany, where he stayed until 1863 promoting immigration to the Canadas.

Wagner accomplished important survey work and wrote about Manitoba, the province which became his home, with accuracy and insight. He represented Woodlands from 1883 to 1886 in the Legislative Assembly of Manitoba as a Conservative.

References 
 Biography at the Dictionary of Canadian Biography Online
 Wagner at German-Canadian studies at the University of Winnipeg, by Karen Brglez, October 9, 2019

1820 births
1901 deaths
Canadian surveyors
Progressive Conservative Party of Manitoba MLAs